Take the Lead is a 2006 American drama dance film directed by Liz Friedlander and starring Antonio Banderas as dance instructor Pierre Dulaine, the founder of Dancing Classrooms. It also stars Alfre Woodard, John Ortiz, Rob Brown, Yaya DaCosta, Dante Basco, Elijah Kelley, and Jenna Dewan. The film was released on April 7, 2006.  Although based in New York City, it was filmed in Toronto. Stock footage of various locations in New York City was used.

Plot

A group of students are preparing for a school dance. Rock arrives with a damaged ticket and is denied entry by Mr. Temple and Principal James. After leaving, Rock is provoked by a group of thugs to vandalize the Principal's car. When Pierre Dulaine comes on the scene, they all run off.

The next morning, Pierre arrives at the school to see the Principal. After explaining that he witnessed her car being vandalized, Pierre offers to take over the detention shift and teach them ballroom dancing. She agrees, although she feels sure that he will not last more than a day. His first class goes badly due to the scepticism and uncooperative personalities of the students. When Pierre returns the next morning, Principal James explains that the reason LaRhette had refused to dance with Rock the day before was because Rock's brother was involved in a gang war, in which one of the casualties was LaRhette's brother.

At Pierre's dance studio, Caitlin is under pressure to learn to dance because her cotillion is approaching. She feels a failure and envies Morgan for her graceful sensuality, remarking to Pierre that she is "like sex on hardwood." This gives Pierre an idea of how to reach out to the kids in detention. He invites Morgan to give them a demonstration of the tango, which inspires the students to be more willing to learn. Caitlin decides to join them for dance class and practices with Monster. Though the other students suspect her of wanting to "tell her upper class friends that she's slumming" at first, they learn to accept her when she admits that she feels better with them.

LaRhette, the daughter of a prostitute, cares for her younger siblings while her mother works the streets. One night, she runs out of the apartment and to the school after one of her mother's clients attempts to rape her. While practicing her dancing, she runs into Rock, who'd gone down there to sleep after losing his job and getting kicked out of his house after a physical confrontation with his drunken father. They fight and are caught by security. Principal James wants to suspend them both, but agrees to give them extra detention with Pierre instead.

Pierre tells the class about a dance competition that he wants them to enter. Gradually, the students begin to trust Pierre; Kurd even visits his apartment to discuss his sexual problems. When the detention basement is flooded, Pierre takes the students to his dance studio to practice. The youngsters become disheartened by the skills of Pierre's students there as well as the $200 entrance fee for the contest. However, Pierre manages to inspire them again and promises to pay the fee. LaRhette and Rock, who have now learned to respect each other, are assigned to compete in the waltz, and rivals Ramos and Danjou learn to share Sasha during practice.

Mr. Temple complains about the school's resources being wasted on the dance program. When Pierre is brought to a meeting with the parents' association, he convinces them to keep the program going after demonstrating how ballroom dancing has taught the students "teamwork, respect, and dignity". On the night of the contest, Rock is told by the gang he has joined that he must participate in a theft. He intentionally shoots the sprinkler system, setting off the alarm, and all have to flee.

At the competition, it is announced that a $5000 prize will be given to the winning team. Monster intervenes in the cotillion and saves Caitlin from tripping. Sasha, Danjou, and Ramos perform an impressive three-person tango but are disqualified because the event is a partner dance. Morgan is awarded the prize but defuses the tension by calling it a tie and giving Sasha her trophy. Principal James is impressed with the success of the program and tells Pierre she is making it permanent. Rock arrives at the last minute to dance the waltz with LaRhette, whom he kisses at the end. The final credits roll as Pierre's students triumphantly dance to hip hop music, having taken over the sound system.

Cast
 Antonio Banderas as Pierre Dulaine, a ballroom dance instructor 
 Alfre Woodard as Principal Augustine James
 John Ortiz as Mr. Joseph Temple, a teacher who only cares for academic success.

Students
 Rob Brown as Jason 'Rock' Rockwell
 Yaya DaCosta as LaRhette Dudley
 Dante Basco as Ramos
 Elijah Kelley as Danjou
 Jenna Dewan as Sasha Bulut, who is caught in a love triangle with Danjou and Ramos. 
 Laura Benanti as Tina
 Jasika Nicole as Egypt
 Brandon D. Andrews as 'Monster', a large and overweight pupil 
 Lauren Collins as Caitlin
 Marcus T. Paulk as Eddie, a talented DJ
 Katya Virshilas as Morgan
 Jonathan Malen as Kurd
 Shawand McKenzie as Big Girl, Monster's cousin
 Joseph Pierre as Trey

The film also stars Alison Sealy-Smith and Phillip Jarrett as Rock's parents; Jo Chim as Gretchen; Kevin Hanchard as Woodley; Joseph Pierre as Trey; Lyriq Bent as Easy; and Sharron Matthews as Ms. Rosemead.

Production

Casting

Banderas initially turned the producers down; not even bothering to read the script. The thought of ballroom dancing sounded "so cheesy", and he felt the film didn't have much of a story. He said to his agent: "nah, I don't want to do this", but after much persuasion, he agreed to meet with the producers; giving them a chance to at least "explain what" they were "trying to do". Once they showed Banderas a documentary on Pierre Dulaine, he said he "loved" it.
He found Dulaine to be "very" fascinating.

Many of the "kids" had little or no acting experience prior to being cast in Take the Lead. Brandon Andrews, who portrayed Monster, had just "graduated [from high school] and had "never auditioned [for a film] before". At the time of his discovery, he was playing on the "football team at Dominguez High School in Compton, California". Likewise, the film marked the feature film debut of Yaya DaCosta. Her only acting experience before the film had been starring in an episode of Eve. Lauren Collins was cast under similar circumstances; like DaCosta, Take the Lead was her first feature film. Although she had the advantage of having worked on various TV shows and television movies since 1998, she found the "entire process" of making a feature film different to working on television. On the other hand, Rob Brown was already a fairly established actor. He was studying at college when cast as Jason "Rock" Rockwell, and graduated after the film's release.

Release
Take the Lead premiered on March 17, 2006 at the RiverRun International Film Festival in Winston-Salem, North Carolina. It was released in Israel on April 6, 2006, followed by the United States and Canada on April 7.  Theatrical releases continued to occur around the world until July 14, 2007.

Critical reception
Metacritic reports a score of 55 out of 100 (based on 30 critics), indicating a "mixed or average" reviews. Rotten Tomatoes reports a similar score; 44 percent of critics gave the film a positive review (based on 119 reviews - 52 "fresh" and 67 "rotten"), with an average rating of 5.4 out of 10. The site's consensus states: "Banderas is charismatic in the lead, and the dance sequences are captivating, but the story is too familiar and predictable."

Roger Ebert, of the Chicago Sun-Times, awarded three out of four stars. Having seen the "charming" documentary Mad Hot Ballroom, he anticipated the "general direction" the film would take. While the film wasn't "particularly original" and lacked the impact of earlier "classroom parables"; Stand and Deliver and Lean on Me, Antonio Banderas was "reason enough" to see the film. From Ebert's perspective, the film was "more fable than record", and "more wishful thinking than a plan of action".

Box office performance
The film earned $4.2 million on its opening day, debuting third place at the domestic box office. It grossed a further $4.9 million on the second day, and another $3 million on the third. In its opening weekend, Take the Lead grossed a total of $12.1 million at the domestic box office. The film's performance proceeded to fluctuate; depending on the day, gross takings could increase by as much as 110 percent and vice versa. The film ultimately grossed a total of $34.7 million at the U.S. box office, and $31 million at the international box office, bringing the worldwide gross to $66 million.

Home video
On August 29, 2006, Take the Lead was released on DVD by New Line Home Entertainment. As of September 22, 2015, the film has grossed $21.2 million in domestic home video sales.

Soundtrack

The official single: "Take The Lead (Wanna Ride)", a collaboration between American hip hop group Bone Thugs-n-Harmony and Puerto Rican duo Wisin & Yandel, featuring rapper Fatman Scoop and singer Melissa Jiménez, was released on March 21, 2006.

Track listing

Notes
 signifies a co-producer
 signifies a remixer

References

External links
 
 
 
 

2006 films
2006 drama films
2000s musical drama films
2006 directorial debut films
American dance films
American musical drama films
Ballroom dancing films
Biographical films about educators
Cultural depictions of dancers
Films about dance competitions
Films about educators
Films scored by Aaron Zigman
Films shot in Toronto
New Line Cinema films
2000s English-language films
2000s dance films
2000s American films